Ernest Gordon Phelps (April 19, 1908 – December 10, 1992) born in Odenton, Maryland, United States was a catcher for the Washington Senators (1931), Chicago Cubs (1933–34), Brooklyn Dodgers (1935–41) and Pittsburgh Pirates (1942).  His .367 batting average in 1936 remains the highest for any catcher in the modern era (1901–present).

He began his professional career with the Hagerstown Hubs of the Blue Ridge League in 1930.  He set several all-time seasonal marks for the Blue Ridge League that year:  at bats (466), hits (175), extra base hits (62) and total bases (300).  He appeared briefly (3 games) at the major league level for the Washington Senators in 1931, but he did not stay permanently until he began playing with the Chicago Cubs in 1933.

He played 726 major league games in 11 seasons, batting .310 (657-for-2117) including 19 triples and 54 home runs, 345 RBI, a .362 on-base percentage, and a .472 slugging percentage.  Phelps was named to the National League All-Star Team from 1938 to 1940, and helped the Dodgers win the 1941 National League pennant.  He died in his hometown at the age of 84.

Sources

Further reading
Johnson, Lloyd and Wolff, Miles, editors: Encyclopedia of Minor League Baseball. Durham, North Carolina Publisher: Baseball America, 2007. Format: Hardback, 767 pp. 

1908 births
1992 deaths
Baseball players from Maryland
Major League Baseball catchers
Washington Senators (1901–1960) players
Chicago Cubs players
Brooklyn Dodgers players
Pittsburgh Pirates players
National League All-Stars
People from Odenton, Maryland
Hagerstown Hubs players
Chattanooga Lookouts players
Parkersburg Parkers players
Youngstown Tubers players
Youngstown Buckeyes players
Albany Senators players